The Georges Labit Museum (founded in 1893) is an archaeological museum located in Toulouse, France. It is dedicated to artifacts from the Far-Eastern and Ancient Egyptian civilizations.

The museum was founded by Georges Labit (1862–1899), a passionate amateur who travelled the world in search of ancient art and artifacts. It is housed in a Moorish villa erected by Toulousian architect Jules Calbayrac. The complex also contains an exotic garden, a specialist library, and a screening room.

External links
Georges Labit Museum Website 

Museums in Toulouse
Museums established in 1893
Asian art museums in France
Egyptological collections in France
Art museums and galleries in France
Ethnographic museums in France
1893 establishments in France